Buffalo Creek is a tributary of the Guyandotte River,  long, in southern West Virginia in the United States. The creek was the site of the Buffalo Creek Flood in 1972.

Buffalo Creek's entire course and drainage area are in eastern Logan County.  It rises near the common boundary of Logan, Wyoming, and Boone counties and flows generally west-southwestward through the unincorporated communities of Saunders, Pardee, Lorado, Craneco, Lundale, Stowe, Crites, Latrobe, Robinette, Amherstdale, Becco, Braeholm, Accoville, Crown, and Kistler, to the town of Man, where it flows into the Guyandotte River from the northeast.

According to the West Virginia Department of Environmental Protection, approximately 92% of the Buffalo Creek watershed is forested, mostly deciduous.

See also
List of rivers of West Virginia

References 

Rivers of West Virginia
Tributaries of the Guyandotte River
Rivers of Logan County, West Virginia